Patrik Daniel Karlsson Lagemyr (born 18 December 1996) is a Swedish footballer who plays for IK Sirius as an attacking midfielder.

References

External links

1996 births
Living people
IFK Göteborg players
IK Sirius Fotboll players
Swedish footballers
Sweden youth international footballers
Allsvenskan players
Association football forwards
Footballers from Gothenburg